Boupha is a surname. Notable people with the surname include:

 Bounyong Boupha, Laotian politician
 Kham Ouane Boupha (born 1932), Laotian soldier and politician
 Khampheng Boupha (1923–2011), Laotian politician

Lao-language surnames